Ingram Park Mall is a super regional shopping center located in the northwest section of San Antonio, Texas, at the intersection of  Interstate 410 and Ingram Road. The anchor stores are Dillard's, JCPenney, and Macy's Backstage. There are 2 vacant anchor stores that were once Dillard’s Home Center and Sears.

History
The mall opened in 1979 with J. C. Penney, Dillard's, Joske's, and Sears. Foley's was added as a fifth anchor in 1983.

In 2015, Sears Holdings spun off 235 of its properties, including the Sears at Ingram Park Mall, into Seritage Growth Properties.

On October 15, 2018, it was announced that Sears would be closing as part of a plan to close 142 stores nationwide.

In 2021, the mall was sold at a foreclosure auction for $100.7 million to an entity associated with the investment firm Morgan Stanley, one month after Simon Property Group defaulted its loan. The sale did not include store space owned by Dillard’s, JCPenney, Sears or Macy’s.

Anchors
Dillard's (184,644 sq ft.)                                                                                        
J. C. Penney (179,714 sq ft.)
Macy's (147,728 sq ft.) (opened 1983 as Foley's, became Macy's 2006)

Former Anchors
Dillard's Home Center - closed in 2016
Sears (150,000 sq ft.) - closed in 2019

References

External links

Shopping malls in San Antonio
Shopping malls established in 1979
1979 establishments in Texas